Lexington is a village in Sanilac County in the U.S. state of Michigan. The population was 1,178 at the 2010 census. The village is located within Lexington Township.

Geography

Demographics

2010 census
As of the census of 2010, there were 1,178 people, 599 households, and 331 families living in the village. The racial makeup of the village was 97.3% White, 0.3% African American, 0.2% Native American, 0.3% Asian, 0.7% from other races, and 1.3% from two or more races. Hispanic or Latino of any race were 1.5% of the population.

There were 599 households, of which 17.5% had children under the age of 18 living with them, 42.2% were married couples living together, 10.2% had a female householder with no husband present, 2.8% had a male householder with no wife present, and 44.7% were non-families. 40.6% of all households were made up of individuals, and 21.4% had someone living alone who was 65 years of age or older. The average household size was 1.95 and the average family size was 2.57.

The median age in the village was 55.2 years. 15.2% of residents were under the age of 18; 6.2% were between the ages of 18 and 24; 14.8% were from 25 to 44; 30.8% were from 45 to 64; and 33% were 65 years of age or older. The gender makeup of the village was 46.3% male and 53.7% female.

2000 census
As of the census of 2000, there were 1,104 people, 550 households, and 305 families living in the village. The racial makeup of the village was 98.82% White, 0.19% Native American, 0.36% Asian, 0.18% from other races, and 0.45% from two or more races. Hispanic or Latino of any race were 1.54% of the population.

There were 550 households, out of which 21.8% had children under the age of 18 living with them, 43.8% were married couples living together, 7.8% had a female householder with no husband present, and 44.5% were non-families. 40.6% of all households were made up of individuals, and 20.2% had someone living alone who was 65 years of age or older.  The average household size was 1.98 and the average family size was 2.65.

In the village, the population was spread out, with 20.0% under the age of 18, 6.7% from 18 to 24, 20.2% from 25 to 44, 26.1% from 45 to 64, and 27.0% who were 65 years of age or older.  The median age was 47 years. For every 100 females, there were 81.9 males.  For every 100 females age 18 and over, there were 74.9 males.

The median income for a household in the village was $30,792, and the median income for a family was $41,364. Males had a median income of $36,346 versus $25,809 for females. The per capita income for the village was $22,218.  About 7.3% of families and 9.4% of the population were below the poverty line, including 12.0% of those under age 18 and 5.4% of those age 65 or over.

Harbor

Lexington Harbor was constructed and maintained by the U.S. Army Corps of Engineers, as authorized by the River and Harbor Act of 1965. The harbor serves mainly recreational boating activities and contains launch/retrieval ramps, fueling facilities, and 190 berthing slips which are operated by both public and private agencies.

Due to infiltration of sediment through and along the peripheral breakwalls, the harbor requires regular dredging to maintain navigable channels. The dredging occurs approximately every 3 to 5 years, with excavated sediment deposited onto the beaches surrounding the breakwalls.

Notable people
Harriet Gertrude Eddy, librarian and educator born in Lexington; California Library Hall of Fame
Louis H. Fead, Chief Justice of the Michigan Supreme Court, was born in Lexington
Walter Lorenzo Marr, automotive pioneer, was born in Lexington
Charles Lathrop Pack, lumberman, was born in Lexington
Albert Sleeper, former Governor of Michigan, lived and died in Lexington

References

Villages in Sanilac County, Michigan
Villages in Michigan
Populated places on Lake Huron in the United States